Kakogawa Steel Works is Kobe Steel, Ltd.'s ironworks in Kakogawa, Hyogo, Japan, established in 1969. It is responsible for about 80 percent of the company's iron and steel production.

In general
Kakogawa Steel Works started in 1969 in the reclaimed land on the Inland Sea, in the south of Kakogawa City, with the plate mill, using the hot slabs shipped from Kobe Steel Works, its main ironworks at that time, located in Kobe City. Iron plates mainly for the shipbuilding industry were important to the company because it is also a large producer of welding rods at its Fujisawa works.

In 1970, a blast furnace was added in Kakogawa. (Kobe Steel Works stopped its last remaining blast furnace in 2017.) Later, a hot rolling mill, a cold rolling mill, and iron bar/iron pipes mills were added. It is an "integrated" steel works. Titanium processing mill is also located here, Kobe Steel having handled Titanium since 1954.

Currently, about 80 percent of Kobe Steel's iron and steel production is done in Kakogawa. Since 2007, only two of the three blast furnaces are in service.

Environmental concern
Since Kakogawa compared to the city 50 years ago is now a big city with population of about 300,000, and has expanded to the coastal areas at the mouth of the Kakogawa River, next to the ironworks, pollution from the material yards of iron ore and coal has become serious, depending on the direction of the wind. Dust-prevention nets have recently been installed in the neighboring residential area.

Data
Space: 510 hectares
Employees: about 2,500
Annual pig iron production: 6,000,000 tons (the fifth largest in Japan)

Transportation
Twenty minutes by taxi from West Japan Railway Company 's Kakogawa Station
Ten minutes by taxi from Sanyo Electric Railway's Befu Station
Twenty minutes from Japan National Route 2's Kakogawa Bypass (exit at Kakogawa-Higashi Interchange)

See also
Kobe Steel
Japan's Steel Works

References

External links
Official site

Iron and steel mills of Japan
Buildings and structures in Hyōgo Prefecture
Companies based in Hyōgo Prefecture
Titanium companies of Japan
Kakogawa, Hyōgo
1969 establishments in Japan